Edith Baumann is an abstract artist based in Santa Monica, California. Her paintings are minimalist and include geometric repetition and patterns, often presented in intense colors.

Biography
Baumann was born in Ames, Iowa in 1948. She received her BFA from the University of California, Los Angeles in 1975 and an MFA from the University of Southern California in 1985. Throughout her career, Baumann has created several series of paintings, including "Bar Paintings", "Spiral Paintings", and "Randomness and Structure Paintings"] Her most recent, are raw pigment acrylic paintings on canvas.

Baumann's work has been featured in many solo and group exhibitions, including in 2018 an exhibition at the Charlotte Jackson Fine Art Gallery in Santa Fe.

In 2014 Baumann was interviewed by Joan Quinn on “The Joan Quinn Profiles” on DoubleGTV

Exhibitions
Solo Exhibitions
1985	 Lindhurst Gallery, University of Southern California, Los Angeles, CA.
1987	 Newspace, Los Angeles, CA.
1988	 Newspace, Los Angeles, CA.
1989	 Rena Bransten Gallery, San Francisco, CA.
1990 Modernism, San Francisco, CA.
1990 Newspace, Los Angeles, CA.
1993 Beatrix Wilhem Gallery, Stuttgart, Germany (catalog).
2005 M&W Art Ltd, Hong Kong, China
2010 Pete and Susan Barrett Art Gallery, Santa Monica, CA.
2011 Modernism, San Francisco, CA.
2012 Katherine Cone Gallery, Culver City, CA.

Select Group Exhibitions
1980 Abstract Painting 1980, Los Angeles Institute of Contemporary Art, CA. (catalog).
1987 Los Angeles Artists: Modern Masters, Ruthven Gallery, Lancaster, Ohio.
1988 After Abstract, Art Center College, Pasadena, CA. (catalog)
1989 Abstract Options, University Art Museum, Univ. of CA, Santa Barbara, CA, (catalog).
1991 A Night of Celebration, Laguna Art Museum, Laguna Beach, CA, Nov.
1992 Intimate Universe, Michael Walls Gallery, New York, NY, September.
1993 The Shape of Things to Come, Laguna Art Museum, Laguna Beach, CA, Nov.
2008 About Abstraction, Chapman Univ. Guggenheim Gallery, Orange, CA. July.
2010 Wall to Wall, Daniel Weinberg Gallery, Los Angeles, CA, June 5-Aug. 14.
2010 The Shape of Space, 222 Shelby St. Gallery, Santa Fe, NM, June 11-July 31.
2011 Marks and Movement: 5 Painters, Barrett Art Gallery, Santa Monica, CA, Oct. 22-Dec. 3 (catalog).
2011 Skin Freaks, Inman Gallery Annex, Houston, TX, May 20-June 25.
2011 What’s New, Pussycat?, The Torrance Art Museum, Torrance, CA, Jan. 22-Mar. 5
2012 Pink, Charlotte Jackson Fine Art, Santa Fe, NM, April 3–24.
2012 California Abstract Painting, 1952-2011, Woodbury University, Burbank, CA, Jan. 21-Mar. 4.
2013 7 Magnifici Anni, Art 1307, Napoli, Italy, Nov. 28 - April 6, 2014.

References

External links 
Artist's website
Interview
Gallery

1948 births
Living people
20th-century American women artists
21st-century American women artists
Artists from California
American abstract artists
People from Ames, Iowa
University of California, Los Angeles alumni
University of Southern California alumni